Béal Deirg (anglicized as Belderg or Belderrig) is a Gaeltacht village and townland in County Mayo, Ireland. At Belderrig Harbour there is a  Mesolithic / Neolithic site dating to 4500-2500 cal. BC. The Céide Fields archaeological site lies about 6 km to the east of Belderrig.

See also
 Behy court tomb
 List of towns and villages in Ireland

References

Towns and villages in County Mayo
Gaeltacht places in County Mayo
Gaeltacht towns and villages